Thomas Paumen (born 7 January 1999) is a Belgian football player. He plays for the Belgian club Patro Eisden.

Club career
He made his Eerste Divisie debut for Roda JC Kerkrade on 14 October 2018 in a game against Go Ahead Eagles as a half-time substitute for Gyliano van Velzen.

References

External links
 

1999 births
Sportspeople from Genk
Footballers from Limburg (Belgium)
Living people
Belgian footballers
Belgian expatriate footballers
Association football midfielders
Roda JC Kerkrade players
K. Patro Eisden Maasmechelen players
Eerste Divisie players
Expatriate footballers in the Netherlands
Belgian expatriate sportspeople in the Netherlands